Paul Adriaan Jan, Baron Janssen (12 September 1926 – 11 November 2003) was a Belgian physician. He was the founder of Janssen Pharmaceutica, a pharmaceutical company with over 20,000 employees which is now a subsidiary of Johnson & Johnson.

Early life and education
Paul Janssen was the son of Constant Janssen and Margriet Fleerackers.

He attended secondary school at the Jesuit St Jozef college in Turnhout, Belgium after which he decided to follow in his father's footsteps and become a physician. During World War II Janssen studied physics, biology and chemistry at the Facultés universitaires Notre-Dame de la Paix (FUNDP) in Namur. He then studied medicine at the Catholic University of Leuven and Ghent University. In 1951, Janssen received his medical degree magna cum laude from Ghent University. He graduated with a postdoctoral degree in pharmacology at the same university in 1956, and studied at the Institute of Pharmacology of the University of Cologne.

On 16 April 1957, he married Dora Arts.

Career
During his military service and until 1952, he worked at the Institute of Pharmacology of the University of Cologne. After he returned to Belgium, he worked part time at the University of Ghent Institute of Pharmacology and Therapeutics, headed by Corneille Heymans, who had won the Nobel Prize for medicine in 1938.

With a loan of fifty thousand Belgian francs received from his father, Janssen founded his own research laboratory in 1953. That same year, he discovered ambucetamide, an antispasmodic found to be particularly effective for the relief of menstrual pain.

In 1956, Janssen received his habilitation in pharmacology with pro venia legendi ("permission to lecture") designation for his thesis on Compounds of the R 79 type. He left the university and established what would become Janssen Pharmaceutica.

On 11 February 1958 he developed haloperidol, a major breakthrough in the treatment of schizophrenia. Working with his team, he developed the fentanyl family of drugs and a number of anesthetic agents, including droperidol and etomidate. One of the anti-diarrheal drugs he developed, diphenoxylate (Lomotil), was used in the Apollo program.

In 1959, Dr. Janssen synthesizes the potent opioid fentanyl based on SAR studies of meperidine. Later, in the 1970s, he would improve upon the potency of fentanyl with the synthesis of Carfentanil.

In 1985, Janssen Pharmaceutical became the first Western pharmaceutical company to establish a factory in the People's Republic of China (Xi'an). In 1995, together with Paul Lewi, he founded the Center for Molecular Design, where he and his team used a supercomputer to search candidate molecules for potential AIDS treatments.

Altogether Janssen and his cadre of scientists discovered more than eighty new medications, four of which are on the WHO list of essential medicines.

In 1991, he was elevated to the Belgian nobility by King Baudouin receiving the title of Baron .

Death
Janssen died in Rome in 2003, while attending the celebration of the 400th anniversary of the founding of the Pontifical Academy of Sciences, of which he had been a member since 1990.

Popularity polls
In 2005 he finished as runner up, after Father Damien, in the poll for The Greatest Belgian organized by the regional Flemish television. 
 On Wednesday 22 October 2008, Paul Janssen was awarded the title of Most Important Belgian Scientist, an initiative of the Eos magazine.

See also
 Gedeon Richter Ltd.
 Gairdner Foundation International Award
 Tibotec
 Rega Institute for Medical Research

References

Further reading
 Lewi, Paul J., Successful Pharmaceutical Discovery: Paul Janssen's Concept of Drug Research, R&D Management, Vol. 37, Issue 4, pp. 355–362, September 2007.
 van Gestel S, Schuermans V, Thirty-three years of drug discovery and research with Dr. Paul Janssen, Drug Development Research, Volume 8, Issue 1–4, pp. 1–13.
 
 Drug Design with Dr. Paul Janssen
 In memory of Dr. Paul Janssen
 Rory Watson, Paul Janssen, BMJ 2003;327;1290
 1996 Australia Prize

External links
 Dr Paul Janssen
 Paul Adriaan Jan Janssen, 1926–2003
 Paul Janssen (Obituary)
 Dr. Paul Janssen Award for Biomedical Research

1926 births
2003 deaths
Barons of Belgium
Flemish businesspeople
Belgian pharmacologists
Belgian Roman Catholics
Flemish physicians
Catholic University of Leuven (1834–1968) alumni
Ghent University alumni
Members of the Pontifical Academy of Sciences
Janssen Pharmaceutica people
People from Turnhout
Australia Prize recipients
Université de Namur alumni
20th-century Belgian inventors
Pharmaceutical company founders